Howard Richards (born June 10, 1938) is a philosopher of Social Science who works with the concepts of basic cultural structures and constitutive rules. He holds the title of Research Professor of Philosophy at Earlham College, a liberal arts college in Richmond, Indiana, the United States, the Quaker School where he taught for thirty years. He retired from Earlham College, together with his wife Caroline Higgins in 2007, and became a Research Professor of Philosophy. He has a Ph.D. in Philosophy from the University of California, Santa Barbara, a Juris Doctor (J.D.) from the Stanford Law School, an Advanced Certificate in Education (ACE) from Oxford University (the UK) and a Ph.D. in Educational Planning  from the Ontario Institute for Studies in Education (OISE), University of Toronto, Canada. He now teaches at the University of Santiago, Chile, and has ongoing roles at the University of South Africa (UNISA)  and the University of Cape Town's Graduate School of Business program.  He is founder of the Peace and Global Studies Program and co-founder of the Business and Nonprofit Management Program at Earlham.

Early life
Howard Richards was born in Pasadena. California, the United States, the eldest child of Kenneth F. Richards, a truck mechanic, originally from Connecticut, and his wife Donna.  It was his mother's intellectual interest in philosophers such as Henri Bergson which prompted the family to break its ties with Mormonism. His paternal grandparents fell into unemployment in Connecticut during the Great Depression and moved to Pasadena in 1932. It was his uncle Jack from his mother's side, who died during World War II, and especially his mother who fostered his early intellectual interest.

Academic background
After graduating from Redlands High School, CA, in June 1956, Richards enrolled in the same year as a Philosophy undergraduate at Yale. Being a top student, he was allowed to skip one year of the normal three-year Major in Philosophy course. Afterward, he was admitted to Stanford Law School in 1958, graduating with a Juris Doctor (J.D.) degree in 1961. Later in that year, he enrolled in graduate school at the University of California Santa Barbara, earning an M.A. in Philosophy there in 1964 with a thesis on Jean-Paul Sartre.  Simultaneously he worked at the Center for the Study of Democratic Institutions think tank where he contributed several articles to the in-house Center Magazine. In 1965 he left for Chile, where they ultimately would settle in the town of Limache. Soon after their arrival, Howard took up the post of Dean of Studies at the Santiago College, (a college in Chile is a secondary school). While in Santiago, Howard joined the Chilean Ministry of Education as an advisor to President Eduardo Frei's Educational Reform, working on a Secondary Curriculum influenced by the ideas of the Brazilian Educator Paulo Freire In late 1970 Richards and his family left for the UK where Richards enrolled for an Advanced Certificate in Education (ACE) at Oxford University, simultaneously doing one on one tutorials and attending seminars by the philosophers Rom Harré and A. J. Ayer. He graduated with an honors thesis on Piaget. Back in Chile in 1972, now under president Salvador Allende, he continued to work with Freire's ideas at CIDE (Centro de Investigación y Desarrollo de la Educación - Educational Research and Development Center) where he founded the Parents and Children Program (Programa Padres e Hijos - PHH), a Community Development combined with a Parent Education program.

Richards and his family left Chile in 1974, after Pinochet's 1973 coup d'état, but not before having helped friends and colleagues escape Pinochet's DINA police. The philosophy curriculum Richards had helped develop was repealed shortly after the coup but was adopted in several other Latin American countries. In September 1974 Richards and his family returned to the USA where he started work at Earlham College in Richmond, Indiana. Later that year he successfully defended his doctoral thesis in Philosophy at the University of California Santa Barbara, having done the preparatory work when still in Chile. While based in Richmond, he attended the Lawrence Kohlberg Summer School on Moral Education at Harvard University. Richards became a professor at Earlham College and was the founding director of its Peace and Global Studies program until 1989 and part-time Director until 2004. Between 1981 and 1985, Richards combined commitments in Richmond with those at OISE, Toronto, with the occasional stay in Quebec where their daughters were studying at a French-speaking school, he enrolled in another Ph.D. program in Education, with the first field in curriculum planning and a second field in applied psychology and moral education, at the University of Toronto's Institute for Studies in Education (UT/OISE), which he successfully completed with a doctoral thesis based on the Chilean PPH program.  He also became an active contributor to the OISE-based  active think-tank about the new economic paradigm known as  The Transformative Learning Centre (TLC).

Social engagement, research and teaching
At Stanford Law School (1958–61) he co-founded the Stanford Political Union's  Socialist Caucus, became involved in the Peace Movement and began volunteer work for farm labor causes. He co-founded, with Stanford radical books seller Roy Kepler, Ira Sandperl and others, the  Peninsula Peace Center, effectively running it for a while.  He was also editor and author of a modest journal called Utopian Papers. After graduation from law school (1961), he joined the Santa Barbara, California Center for the Study of Democratic Institutions headed by Robert Hutchins to whom he became a personal assistant, and became the first volunteer attorney for Cesar Chavez'  Farm Workers Association when he started organizing the FWA in Delano, California. He worked as evaluator of cultural change projects in Costa Rica, Ecuador, Bolivia and Chile  He also did evaluative work on economic institutions (Economía Solidaria) in Argentina. Economic theory and Community Development together with Public Employment Programs are his more recent research areas.

He is on the Advisory Board of Human Dignity and Humiliation Studies (HumanDHS), a global transdisciplinary fellowship of concerned academics and practitioners who wish to promote dignity and transcend humiliation. Richards' principal teaching experience stretches from 1974 to 2007 as  Professor of Philosophy and Education on the Peace and Global Studies Program (PAGS) at Earlham College. When no longer at Earlham, he taught short courses in different international locations. Starting in 2009 he became a distinguished fellow of the South African Research Chairs Initiative in Development Education (SARChI)  based at the University of South Africa (UNISA) Pretoria, and then a collaborator at the Johannesburg-based Seriti Institute with Dr. Gavin Andersson. In South Africa, too, he teaches in the Executive MBA Program at the University of Cape Town. He is also co-chair of the Chilean group Repensar Ia Economía (Re-thinking the Economy).

Law practice
Howard Richards was the first volunteer attorney for Cesar Chavez and Dolores Huerta, when they started to organize farm workers in Delano, in California's Central Valley. Richards specialized in Bankruptcy as a partner in the firm of Crane, Richards, and Flores after joining the Legal Aid Foundation in 1989. In 1990 he also was a voluntary attorney at the Los Angeles Free Clinic, a practice he wound up in 2004, when he moved back to Limache, Chile.

Major works and ideas
 In his first major work, The Evaluation of Cultural Action (1984), Richards "unveils throughout the text the rationale for using an 'illuminative' approach (Parlett and Hamilton, 1974) rather than a conventional 'systems' assessment". The long dialogue with a "reasonable social scientist" gravitates around how to evaluate education and community development efforts inspired by the Brazilian adult educationist Paulo Freire's philosophy, combined with an empirical study of one such effort, namely PPH (Parents and Children Program) that flourished among peasants in the south of Chile in the 1970s and 1980s.
 Richards' two-volume Letters from Quebec: a Philosophy for Peace and Justice (1994)   aspires to be both literary entertainment and the history of rationality in western culture and philosophy, illuminating the possibilities for transformative and humanistic action. The subtitle of volume Two of Letters from Quebec is  'Methods for Transforming the  Structures of the Modern World'. Taking leads from Paulo Freire and Antonio Gramsci, the philosopher is seen - borrowing a phrase from Paulo Freire - as a 'cultural activist' who invents rationalities.
  Building on the premise that standards of rationality are historically constructed social norms, he went on, in Understanding the Global Economy (2004), to argue that causal explanations in economics invariably rely, as premises, on cultural norms, and particularly on constitutive rules  Richards proposes to understand institutions by following out the consequences of the rules that organize them. Understanding the Global Economy reviews the principal schools of economic thought with respect to the causal explanations they offer of the phenomena of today's global economy.
 The Dilemmas of Social Democracies: Overcoming Obstacles to a More Just World (2008) co-authored with Joanna Swanger, applies the philosophical ideas of Richards' earlier works,  particularly a concept of basic cultural structure, - where 'basic' identifies those cultural structures that govern the satisfaction of the basic needs of life  - to historical case studies of Spain,  Sweden,  Austria,  South Africa, Indonesia, Venezuela, and the World Bank. The upshot is that social democracy is not feasible with the framework provided by the constitutive rules of modernity. Social democracy can only become feasible by adopting an approach Richards and another co-author, Gavin Andersson, will later call unbounded organization.
 Gandhi and the Future of Economics (2011)  "makes a case for incorporating Gandhi's insights into mainstream economics. Gandhi and the Future of Economics is not meant to be a research study of Gandhian economics. It is rather that kind of felicitous publication that breathes new life into a known theme, and, in doing so, brings out its implications for praxis. It does all this in dialogue with a set of contemporary thinkers and actors from the Indian sub-continent: Jawaharlal Nehru, Jayaprakash Narayan, Tariq Ali, Vandana Shiva, Amartya Sen, Arundhati Roy, Manmohan Singh." (Ivo Coelho).
  The Nurturing of Time Future (2012) defines itself as "a short book about everything", addressed to educated people of goodwill who see the need for paradigmatic change. It proposes a philosophy in the old-fashioned sense of articulating a synthesis of the social and natural sciences that provides an overall framework for deciding what to do. It is a 'belles lettres' exercise written in the style of Marcel Proust.
 Rethinking Thinking: Modernity's "Other" and the transformation of the University (2012)  co-authored with Catherine Hoppers, further develops a theme found in early works – that modernity has much to learn from pre-modernity. It includes an account of how the constitutive rules of markets presupposed by economics developed in Roman Law.  They are contrasted with indigenous African cultural norms. Rethinking also argues that bringing modernity's "other" into the curriculum of the university will transform the curriculum, transform research and transform community engagement.
 Richards' most recent book Unbounded Organizing in Community (2015), co-authored with Gavin Andersson of South Africa's Seriti Institute, offers a combination of a down to earth, practical guide to doing community organizing inspired by the Organization Workshops of Clodomir Santos de Morais, with an elementary introduction to Andersson's theory of  unbounded organization. Emphasis is on practical examples and guidelines for organizers and participants.

Other books and articles
Richards has also published fourteen other books some in English and some in Spanish, among the latter,  Richards, 1987,  Ética y Economía (Ethics and Economics), and  González Meyer & Richards (2012)
Hacia otras Economias. Critica al paradigma dominante (Towards other Economies - Critique of the Dominant Paradigm). A list of Richards' other books, articles, conferences and speeches (e.g.  Howard Richards, 1995 Nehru Lectures) can be found on HR Professor of Peace and Global Studies (up to 2010),  HR Bibliography, HR website and the more recent Unbounded Organization webpage.

Personal life 
Richards married Caroline Higgins in July 1965. They have two daughters.

See also 
 Evelin Lindner
 Betty Reardon

Publications

Notes

References

External links 
 Against Foucault: Toward an Epistemology of Hope (12 Conversations).
 Economía Solidaria Economy of Solidarity
 Howard Richards Professor of Peace and Global Studies.
 Peace and Global Studies Program (PAGS) Earlham College
 Professor Richards' Video Conversations
 Repensar. (Rethinking the Economy - Chile).
 Seriti Institute Seriti Institute South Africa.
 The Theory of Growth Points. (see PDF for transcript).
 Human Dignity and Humiliation Studies (scroll down to 'R').
   Twelve Things We Can Do Every Day for World Peace and Justice.
 Unbounded Organization (with Gavin Andersson) (3 Conversations).
 Unbounded Organization Website.
 A Vision of a World without Poverty or Economic Insecurity.

1938 births
Living people
Writers from Pasadena, California
People from Valparaíso Province
American philosophers
Philosophers of social science
American lawyers
20th-century American non-fiction writers
Writers about activism and social change
Peace and conflict scholars
Community development
Community organizing
Ethicists
Earlham College faculty
Educational administration
Stanford Law School faculty
21st-century American non-fiction writers
American male non-fiction writers
20th-century American male writers
21st-century American male writers